Domanivka is an urban-type settlement in Voznesensk Raion in the west of Mykolaiv Oblast, Ukraine. It hosts the administration of Domanivka settlement hromada, one of the hromadas of Ukraine. Population: 

Domanivka is located on the banks of the Chortala River, a left tributary of the Southern Bug.

History
On 16 April 1920, Odessa Governorate was established. Domanivka was the center of Domanivskaya Volost and belonged to Voznesensky Uyezd of Kherson Governorate. In 1923, uyezds in Ukrainian Soviet Socialist Republic were abolished, and the governorates were divided into okruhas. In 1923, Kantakuzynka Raion with the administrative center in the selo of Kantakuzynka was established, and Domanivka became the part of the raion. It belonged to Pervomaisk Okruha. In 1925, the governorates were abolished, and okruhas were directly subordinated to Ukrainian SSR. On 3 February 1926, Katakuzynka Raion was renamed Domanivka Raion, and the center was moved to Domanivka. In 1930, okruhas were abolished, and on 27 February 1932, Odessa Oblast was established, and Domanivka Raion was included into Odessa Oblast. During World War II, 18,000 local Jews were murdered on the spot. The victims were killed, mainly by the Romanian constabulary, the Romanian army supported by Ukrainian militia and the Sonderkommando. In February 1954, Domanivka Raion was transferred to Mykolaiv Oblast. In 1956, Domanivka was granted urban-type settlement status.

On 18 July 2020, Domanivka Raion was abolished as part of the administrative reform of Ukraine, which reduced the number of raions of Mykolaiv Oblast to four. The area of Domanivka Raion was merged into Voznesensk Raion.

Economy

Transportation

References

Urban-type settlements in Voznesensk Raion
Ananyevsky Uyezd
Jewish Ukrainian history
Holocaust locations in Ukraine